Michta is a surname. It may refer to:

 Andrew A. Michta (born 1956), American political scientist
 Maria Michta-Coffey (born 1986), American race walker
 20286 Michta, minor planet

See also
 

Polish-language surnames